Ernest James "Ginger" Cameron (20 February 1888 – 16 December 1946) was an Australian rules footballer who played with Essendon in the Victorian Football League (VFL). He was a premiership player for the club in 1911.

A rover, nicknamed "Ginger", he made his debut for Essendon in 1905. Cameron was a back-to-back Best and Fairest winner for Essendon, winning the award in 1911 and 1912.

After breaking his leg during the 1912 finals series he was forced to retire from the game at just 23.

References

Holmesby, Russell and Main, Jim (2007). The Encyclopedia of AFL Footballers. 7th ed. Melbourne: Bas Publishing.
Essendon Football Club profile

1888 births
1946 deaths
Australian rules footballers from Melbourne
Essendon Football Club players
Essendon Football Club Premiership players
Crichton Medal winners
Australian military personnel of World War I
One-time VFL/AFL Premiership players
People from North Melbourne